Stanley Newman (born July 19, 1952) is an American puzzle creator, editor, and publisher.  Newman has been the editor of the Newsday Sunday crossword puzzle since 1988 and the editor of the Newsday daily crossword puzzle since 1992.  He is also a trivia buff and the co-author of a trivia encyclopedia, 15,003 Answers.

Newman is a native of Brooklyn, New York, and is a Phi Beta Kappa graduate of Brooklyn College, where he majored in mathematics.  He went on to earn a master’s degree in statistics from Rutgers University.

Newman's puzzle career started after he won the inaugural U.S. Open Crossword Championship in 1982.  He also won the American Crossword Puzzle Tournament that year.  Newman started a crossword newsletter in 1983 and began creating his own crosswords soon thereafter.  He is the author or editor of over 100 books and is the current world record holder for the fastest solving of a New York Times crossword. 

In 1990, Newman appeared as a contestant on The Challengers television game show and was its biggest winner, finishing with a grand total of $112,480. Over half of that came from his win in the series' Invitational Tournament of Champions, along with a $31,000 Ultimate Challenge win (Unfortunately for Newman, his final day ended with him in negative territory, and thus he was unable to compete in the Final Challenge). He currently is a regular contestant at the Allentown, Pennsylvania Trivia Bowl, held twice annually.

Newman lives in Massapequa Park, New York with his wife and has three grown children.

References

External links
Stanley Newman's official website
Profile at Creators Syndicate

1952 births
Contestants on American game shows
Puzzle designers
Crossword compilers
Living people
People from Brooklyn
People from Massapequa Park, New York
Brooklyn College alumni